Angélique is a 2013 French period drama and adventure film loosely based on the 1956 novel Angélique, the Marquise of the Angels by Anne Golon.

Cast

References

External links

Reviews of Angélique by film critics from different countries
Official website of Angélique in French
Official website of Angélique in English

2010s historical adventure films
French historical adventure films
Films based on French novels
Films based on adaptations
Films set in the 1650s
Films set in the 1660s
Remakes of French films
Films shot in Austria
Films shot in Belgium
Films shot in the Czech Republic
Films scored by Nathaniel Méchaly
Films directed by Ariel Zeitoun
French historical action films
2010s historical action films
2010s French-language films
2010s French films